Duarte Urtigueira Gouveia Beirão Valente (born 2 November 1999) is a Portuguese professional footballer who plays as a midfielder.

Club career
On 14 August 2017, Valente made his professional debut with Estoril Praia in a 2017–18 Primeira Liga match against Vitória Guimarães.

References

External links

1999 births
Living people
Sportspeople from Cascais
Portuguese footballers
Association football midfielders
Primeira Liga players
G.D. Estoril Praia players
Portugal youth international footballers